Neuronal PAS domain protein 4 is a protein that in humans is encoded by the NPAS4 gene. The NPAS4 gene is a neuronal activity-dependent immediate early gene that has been identified as a transcription factor.  The protein regulates the transcription of genes that control inhibitory synapse development, synaptic plasticity and most recently reported also behavior.

Function

NXF is a member of the basic helix-loop-helix-PER-ARNT-SIM (bHLH-PAS) class of transcriptional regulators, which are involved in a wide range of physiologic and developmental events (Ooe et al., 2004 [PubMed 14701734]).[supplied by OMIM, Mar 2008].

Npas4 has been shown by Dr. Brenda Bloodgood to play critical roles in regulating the plasticity of inhibitory neurons. She found that Npas4 helps to regulate plasticity by orchestrating a redistribution of synaptic inputs, biasing them towards dendrites over neuronal cell bodies which increases dendritic plasticity.

References

Further reading